Kindattu (ki-in-da-tu, also Kindadu, reigned ca. 2000 BC, middle Chronology) was the 6th king of the Shimashki Dynasty, in Elam (in present-day southwest Iran), at the time of the third dynasty of Ur in ancient Lower Mesopotamia.

He is mentioned in the Shilhak-Inshushinak list of kings who did work on the Inshushinak temple in Susa. Apparently, Kindattu invaded and conquered Ur (2004 BC), and captured Ibbi-Sin, the last of the third dynasty of Ur, and made him a prisoner.  The Elamites sacked Ur and settled there, but then were defeated by Ishbi-Erra, the first king of the Isin dynasty in his year 16, and later expelled from Mesopotamia.

The destructions are related in the Lament for Ur:

The Lament for Sumer and Ur then describes the fate of Ibbi-Sin:

An Hymn to Ishbi-Erra, although quite fragmentary, mentions the role played by Kindattu in the destruction of Ur.

See also
 City Lament

References

Elamite kings
Shimashki Dynasty